Ram Charan Agarwal was an Indian politician and freedom fighter who served as Deputy Mayor of Delhi. He is the father of Jai Parkash Aggarwal.

Honors 

In 2009, India Post honored him by issuing stamp on him.
In 2021, he got tribute years after his death by Mahabal Mishra, Shaktisinh Gohil and Jai Parkash Aggarwal.

References 

Year of birth missing
Year of death missing
Indian independence activists